Jana G. Oliver is an American author. Her books cross many genres, including romance/fantasy and historical mystery. An Iowa native, she currently lives in Atlanta, Georgia.

Her Time Rovers Series is published by Dragon Moon Press, a Canadian speculative fiction publisher. The series has been nominated for fifteen awards and has won twelve, including ForeWord Magazine's Editor's Choice Book of the Year, the first time a science fiction novel has received that honor.

In April 2009, Ms. Oliver was signed by St. Martin's Press to write the Demon Trappers Series for young adults 14 and above. The series will also be published in the United Kingdom, Germany, France, Brazil, Russia and Turkey.

Published works

Time Rovers® Series
Sojourn Dragon Moon Press, 2006
Virtual Evil Dragon Moon Press, 2007
Madman's Dance Dragon Moon Press, 2008

Demon Trappers® Series
The Demon Trapper's Daughter: A Demon Trappers Novel, St. Martin's Griffin, 2011 
Soul Thief: A Demon Trappers Novel, St. Martin's Griffin, 2011 
Forgiven, St. Martin's Griffin, 2012 
Foretold, St. Martin's Griffin, 2012

U.K. editions
The Demon Trappers: Forsaken Macmillan Children's Books - Bk 1, 2011
The Demon Trappers: Forbidden Macmillan Children's Books - Bk 2, 2011
The Demon Trappers: Forgiven Macmillan Children's Books - Bk 3, 2012
The Demon Trappers: Foretold Macmillan Children's Books - Bk 4, 2012

German editions
Die Dämonenfängerin #1: Aller Anfang ist Hölle Fischer FJB - Bk 1, 2011
Die Dämonenfängerin #1: Aller Anfang ist Hölle Fischer FJB Audio Bk 1, 2011
Riley Blackthorne: Die Dämonenfängerin #1: Aller Anfang ist Hölle Fischer FJB Taschenbuch, 2012
Riley Blackthorne: Die Dämonenfängerin #2: Seelenraub Fischer FJB Taschenbuch, 2012
Riley Blackthorne: Die Dämonenfängerin #3: Höllenflüstern Fischer FJB Taschenbuch, 2013

Anthologies
The Ladies of Trade Town (THE LAST VIRGIN) HarpHaven Publishing, 2011

Non-fiction
The Complete Guide to Writing Fantasy: Vol. 3 AnthologyDragon Moon Press, 2007 
Nyx in the House of Night (BY THEIR MARKS YOU SHALL KNOW THEM) BenBella Books, 2011 (

U.S. works in progress
Forbidden St. Martin's Griffin - Demon Trappers Book 3, March 2012

Foreign works in progress
The Demon Trappers: Forgiven (Demon Trappers Book 3) Macmillan Children's Books, March, 2012

Awards receivedTime Rovers SeriesBookseller's Best -- (Sojourn)
Daphne du Maurier -- (Sojourn) 
Desert Rose Golden Quill -- (Sojourn)
ForeWord Magazine Editor's Choice Book of the Year -- (Sojourn) 
ForeWord Award Science Fiction -- (Virtual Evil)
Independent Publisher Award Gold Medal -- (Sojourn)
Independent Publisher Award Gold Medal -- (Virtual Evil)
Independent Publisher Award Silver Medal -- (Madman's Dance) 
Pluto Award -- (Sojourn)
Pluto Award -- (Virtual Evil) 
Prism Award for Time Travel -- (Sojourn)
Prism Award for Time Travel -- (Madman's Dance'')

External links
Author's site
US Demon Trappers site
UK Demon Trappers site
Time Rovers® site

References

American women writers
Living people
Year of birth missing (living people)
Writers from Atlanta
21st-century American women